The Buxton line is a railway line in Northern England, connecting Manchester with Buxton in Derbyshire.  Passenger services on the line are currently operated by Northern Trains.

History

In 1863, it built an extension from Whaley Bridge, via  to Buxton. This forestalled the Manchester, Sheffield and Lincolnshire Railway's plans for the area, and also the Midland Railway's attempts to reach Manchester.

The latter two railways were forced to combine forces in a line following the LNWR, but north of it, through New Mills (part of what is now known as the Hope Valley line), branching at Millers Dale. As a result, Buxton, one of the largest towns in the Peak District, never achieved mainline status.

The LNWR had offered the use of the line but, with its climb through Dove Holes, the Midland did not consider it useful for express trains, saying that it went up a steep hill merely for the sake of going down. The LNWR may have saved costs in construction but it proved difficult to operate, even with the powerful locomotives they had been forced to introduce for their lines north of Manchester. In later days, a  stretch was operated using banking engines, the longest such section on the British railway system. From 8 October 1956, services on the Buxton branch were in the hands of Class 104 diesel units based at Buxton depot, though some remained steam worked for longer (for example, the 08:20 train to Manchester switched to diesel on 17 June 1957).

The Beeching cuts threatened closure but the line was reprieved at a hearing in 1964. In its 1964 accounts, British Rail counted the cost of the reprieve at £133,000 (£2.4m at 2014 prices) in a full year, plus £44,000 which could have been saved if freight was also withdrawn.

The line was electrified, at 25 kV AC overhead, between Manchester and Hazel Grove in 1981. A chord just south of Hazel Grove was built in 1986, allowing trains to change from the Hope Valley Line and thus faster running into Manchester Piccadilly.

In June 2016, a landslip at Middlewood station following heavy rain meant that all services were suspended between Hazel Grove and Buxton until 25 June. A rail replacement bus service was in operation during the closure.

On 31 July 2019, the line was closed between Hazel Grove and Buxton amid fears that the earthwork dam at Toddbrook Reservoir would collapse following heavy rain, which would flood the village of Whaley Bridge. The line was re-opened on 8 August. Bus replacements were on operation between Buxton and Macclesfield during the closure.

Present-day services
Over the section of track between Manchester and Hazel Grove there are three trains per hour in each direction at peak times. The Manchester to Buxton service runs half-hourly during peak hours, and once hourly at off peak. Up until the timetable changes on 11th December 2022, this combined with an hourly (daytime-only) Blackpool North to Hazel Grove service to give Davenport, Woodsmoor and Hazel Grove stations thrice-hourly off peak services to and from Manchester. Since then, the Blackpool North train has run to and from Manchester Airport instead, reducing the number of trains between Piccadilly to Hazel Grove down to two trains per hour at off peak. No services ran beyond Piccadilly between May 2018  and May 2019  due to the electrification of the line through Bolton. 

South of Hazel Grove, the off-peak pattern is half-hourly. The hourly Liverpool to Norwich East Midlands Railway and Manchester Airport to Cleethorpes TransPennine Express services run over the Edgeley to Hazel Grove section but only one East Midlands Railway service calls at Hazel Grove on weekday mornings and Sundays, all others being non-stop between Stockport and Sheffield.

Due to steep gradients on this line, Class 142 and Class 153 DMUs are banned from the section of line between Hazel Grove and Buxton. Therefore, services to Buxton are worked by Class 150 and Class 156 DMUs. Also Class 158 DMUs were once blocked from operating on the line to Buxton due to the possibility of the large roof-mounted air vents striking low bridges on the route. Piccadilly to Hazel Grove services used Class 323 electric multiple units up until 2008. Class 319 and Class 331 units are now used for the Blackpool to Hazel Grove service.

Passenger information systems have been installed at most stations on the line since 2011, including the terminus at Buxton, Hazel Grove, New Mills Newtown and Whaley Bridge.

Route

At the end of the curve a spur (opened to goods on 12 December 1883 and to passengers on 1 July 1884) linked it to Cheadle station and the Stockport, Timperley and Altrincham Junction Railway until the 1960s.

Just beyond Hazel Grove,  from Edgeley Junction, a 1986 (originally planned in 1933) junction links the line with the Hope Valley Line through Disley Tunnel. At Middlewood there was a junction (from 26 May 1885 to 1954) to allow trains to run between Buxton and Macclesfield via the Macclesfield, Bollington and Marple Railway. East of that junction the line passes in a short tunnel under the Macclesfield Canal.  east it runs in a cutting across the edge of Lyme Park, home of Thomas Legh, first Chairman of the Stockport, Disley and Whaley Bridge Railway.

Just east of Disley station the line runs through another short tunnel into the Goyt valley, which it gently drops down to Furness Vale, running close to and parallel to the Hope Valley Line, Peak Forest Canal and A6. At Whaley Bridge the line joined the  Cromford and High Peak Railway, the link to Shallcross Yard remaining until January 1965.

Here the line leaves the Goyt valley to climb  at 1 in 60 or 1 in 58 to Dove Holes.

References 

Pixton, B., (2000) North Midland: Portrait of a Famous Route, Cheltenham: Runpast Publishing
 Bentley, C., (1997) British Railways Operating History: Volume one, The Peak District, Carnarvon: XPress Publishing.

External links

1947 map showing former junctions

Line
Rail transport in Derbyshire
Rail transport in Greater Manchester
Railway lines in North West England
Railway lines in the East Midlands
Standard gauge railways in England